Nebularium is the debut studio album by the Italian melodic death metal band, Disarmonia Mundi. It was independently released and recorded by Ettore Rigotti in his home studio. The album would help the group obtain a recording contract with Italian-based Scarlet Records. The album was re-released on June 26, 2009 in a remastered version with new artwork as a double digipak with a new EP entitled The Restless Memoirs.

Track listing 

 "Into D.M." – 3:06
 "Blue Lake" – 7:02
 "Mechanichell" – 5:02
 "Guilty Claims" – 7:15
 "Burning Cells" – 4:38
 "Demiurgo" – 7:07
 "Nebularium" – 7:07
 "Awakening" – 2:51
 "Chester" (Live in-studio bonus) – 3:58

The Restless Memoirs track listing 

 "Across the Burning Surface" – 4:12 (Recorded in 2006)
 "Flare" – 3:08 (Recorded in 1999)
 "Spiral Dancer" – 3:40 (Recorded in 2005)
 "Kneeling on Broken glass" – 3:48 (Recorded in 2006)
 "Chester" – 3:56 (Recorded in 2000)
 "Ghost Song" – 3:15 (Recorded in 1999)

 Comes with the Nebularium album

Personnel

Band members 

 Benny Bianco Chinto – vocals
 Ettore Rigotti – guitars, drums, keyboards, vocals
 Simone Palermiti – guitars, keyboards
 Mirco Andreis – bass guitar
 Claudio Ravinale (The Restless Memoirs only) − vocals, lyrics
 Federico Cagliero aka "FedAz" - guitar solos on (1, 2, 3, 4, 5, 6, 7), guitars/songwriting on "Awakening" and "Chester"

Production and other 

 Produced and recorded by Ettore Rigotti at dB Studio.
 Mixed and mastered by Ettore Rigotti and Alessandro Vanara at dB Studio - Summer 2001.
 Artwork by Marco Corti
 Artwork conceived and realized by Marco Corti.

References 

Disarmonia Mundi albums
2001 debut albums
2009 EPs